Dawid Przysiek (born 4 February 1987) is a Polish handball player for Arka Gdynia and the Polish national team.

References

1987 births
Living people
Polish male handball players
People from Wągrowiec